Masino is a surname. Notable people with the surname include:

 Al Masino (1928–2006), American professional basketball player
 Denise Masino (born 1968), American bodybuilder

See also
 Val Masino, Italian commune
 Masino Intaray (1943–2013), Filipino poet and musician

Italian-language surnames